Bradd is a name. Notable people with this name include:

 Bradd Wong (born 1960), American actor
 Bradd Dalziell (born 1987), Australian football player
 Bradd Shore (born 1945), American anthropologist
 Bradd Westmoreland (born 1975), Australian painter
 Les Bradd (born 1947), English football player